Histria or Istros (Thracian river god, Danube), was a Greek colony or polis (πόλις, city) near the mouths of the Danube (known as Ister in Ancient Greek), on the western coast of the Black Sea. It was the first urban settlement on today's Romanian territory when founded by Milesian settlers in the 7th century BC. It was under Roman rule from the 1st to 3rd centuries AD. Invasions during the 7th century AD rendered it indefensible, and the city was abandoned. In antiquity, it also bore the names Istropolis, Istriopolis, and Histriopolis (Ἰστρόπολις, Ἰστρία πόλις).

Histriopolis was a fort in the Roman province of Moesia. As Tabula Peutingeriana shows it is situated between Tomis and Ad Stoma; 11 miles from Tomis and 9 miles from Ad Stoma.

History
Established by Milesian settlers in order to facilitate trade with the native Getae, it is considered the oldest urban settlement on Romanian territory. Scymnus of Chios (ca 110 BC), dated its founding to 630 BC, while Eusebius of Caesarea set it during the time of the 33rd Olympic Games (657 – 656 BC). The earliest documented currency on today's Romanian territory was an 8-gram silver drachma, issued by the city around 480 BC. 

Archaeological evidence seems to confirm that all trade with the interior followed the foundation of Histria. Traders reached the interior via Histria and the Danube valley, demonstrated by finds of Attic black-figure pottery, coins, ornamental objects, an Ionian lebes and many fragments of amphoras. Amphoras have been found in great quantity at Histria, some imported but some local. Local pottery was produced following establishment of the colony and certainly before the mid-6th century. During the archaic and classical periods, when Histria flourished, it was situated near fertile arable land. It served as a port of trade soon after its establishment, with fishing and agriculture as additional sources of income. By 100 AD, however, fishing had become the main source of Istrian revenue.

Around 30 AD, Histria came under Roman domination. During the Roman period from the 1st to 3rd centuries AD, temples were built for the Roman gods, besides a public bath and houses for the wealthy. Altogether, it was in continuous existence for some 14 centuries, starting with the Greek period up to the Roman-Byzantine period. The Halmyris bay where was the city founded was closed by sand deposits and access to the Black Sea gradually was cut. Trade continued until the 6th century AD. The invasion of the Avars and the Slavs in the 7th century AD almost entirely destroyed the fortress, and the Istrians dispersed; the name and the city disappeared.

Geographic setting
The ancient seashore has since been transformed into the western shore of Sinoe Lake, as the Danube's silt deposits formed a shoal which closed off the ancient coastline. The current Sinoe Lake was at the time the open northern bay, while another bay on the southern shore served as the port. The acropolis with sanctuaries was established on the highest point of the coastal plain. The settlement itself, erected in the 6th century, was 1/2 mile (800 meters) to the west of the acropolis. The settlement had stone paved streets and was protected by strong wall. Water was collected along 12.5 mile (20 km) long aqueducts.

Archaeology
The ruins of the settlement were first identified in 1868 by French archaeologist Ernest Desjardins. Archaeological excavations were started by Vasile Pârvan in 1914, and continued after his death in 1927 by teams of archaeologists led successively by Scarlat and Marcelle Lambrino (1928–1943), Emil Condurachi (1949–1971), Dionisie Pippidi (1971-1989), Petre Alexandrescu (1990-1999), Alexandru Suceveanu (1990-2009), Alexandru Avram and Mircea Angelescu (starting 2010). The Histria Museum, founded in 1982, exhibits some of these finds. The excavation project and site also features prominently in the film The Ister.

Archeological research in Histria managed to identify and classify several layers on site. The layer stratification can be divided primarily between the Archaic and Classical periods:

Archaic Greek layers
The ancient Greek city covered around 60 hectares. There are very few written references to the archaic city and archeological research provides the main historical resource. The main deity was Apollo Ietros (The Healer). Zeus (Gr. Polieus) was the protector deity of the city and Aphrodita was also confirmed by archeological research. Historians believe all six Milesian tribes (Greek: phylai) were represented in the colony, yet only four tribes are attested to: the Aigikoreis, Argadeis, Boreis and Geleontes. The only clue concerning the government of the city was given by Aristotle in Politica. Thanks to his comment, it is clear that the first government of Histria was an oligarchy. From an economic point of view, the town was developed around port-related activities.

Archaic Greek layer I (650–600 BC)

After the stage of emporium, a polis was founded soon after 650 BC. Temples and dwellings of this time were discovered. By the beginning of the VIth  century Histria was already a prosperous colony.

Archaic Greek layer II (600–550 BC)
During this period a new city wall was built around the city, probably in connection with the frequent raids of the scythians.
The Acropolis started to be defended by a wall, discovered by Sc. Lambrino. Another city wall was running around the western Plateau, defending also the port.

Archaic Greek layer III (550–500 BC)
The Archaic age of Histria is finishing with a massive destruction on the occasion, most probably, of an expedition of the Persian general Mardonios (Mardonios (old Persian Marduniya, Persian Mrdunya, Greek Μαρδόνιος (Mardónios), Latin Mardonius; † 479 B. C. during the battle of Plateaea).
Another theory says the destruction of the city has taken place, probably in 512 BC, when Darius I undertook a war against the Scythians. It is still unclear if this fact is connected to the Persian expedition led by Darius, to the Scythians followers of the Persian army during the retreat or to the expedition of Mardonios.

Human Sacrifice Evidence 
In 2021, the article "Of Human Sacrifice and Barbarity: a case study of the Late Archaic Tumulus XVII at Istros" was released.  In this article, M. Fowler (2021) presents the evidence found at the Northern Necropolis of the Pontic Greek settlement that supports the claim of human sacrifice being practiced in this area.

Classical Greek layers
During the classical period, there was continuity in the cults of Apollo Ietros; Zeus (Gr. Polieus) and Aphrodita. During the classical period many written sources describe the political organisation of the area.
The Odrysian kingdom was involved in fighting with the Scythians ruled by Ariapeithes and Histria was situated between the two kingdoms. Due to that, most probably, Histria town was forced to join the Delian League. In the 5th century BC, these colonies were under the influence of the Delian League, passing in this period from oligarchy to democracy. From an economic point of view it was during this era that the first Histrian coins were minted: a didrachma, oboli and bronze coins.

Classical Greek layer I (500–425 BC)
The town was flourishing in the period of Athens's Peloponnesian Wars when the Athenian fleet came to the Greek colonies placed on the shores of the Pontos Euxeinos (Black Sea) to collect the contributions for the Delian Treasure (Thucydides). A new wall was built to protect a wider area then before, around the Histrian Acropolis, probably in connection with the democratic "revolution" mentioned by Aristotle in The Politics (cap. 5), referring to the change of the Histrian constitution, evolving from oligarchy to democracy. The city wall, protecting the settlement and the port, was repaired.

Classical Greek layer II (425–350 BC)
The town was dismantled for a second time in the 4th century BC, during the war between the Scythian king Ateas and Macedonian king Philip II. who destroyed the city walls protecting the Acropolis and the one protecting the whole town.

Hellenistic layers

During the Hellenistic period, there was continuity in the cult of Apollo Ietros, Zeus (Gr. Polieus) and Aphrodita. A new temple for a grand deity was built. There is also evidence of the cult of Athena, Poseidon, Helikonios, Taurios, Demetra, Hermes Agoraios, Heracles, Asclepios, Dioscurii and others. A new wall also appears, protecting a 10 ha area. During the Hellenistic period Histria had become an important supplier of grain for Greece. However, the economic power of Histria was represented by trade. In the Hellenistic period, the gymnasium and the theater were erected.

Hellenistic layer I (350–300 BC)
The town was once again destroyed around 339 BC. During the period 313–309 BC, a rebellion of Pontic towns took place.  Miletus however awarded Histrians equal political rights, or so-called isopoliteia.

Hellenistic layer II (300–175 BC)
Around 260 BC, Byzantium was involved in a dispute with Histria and Callatis (modern Mangalia) over Tomis emporion (Εμπόριον, market) (i.e. modern Constanţa). Another destruction of the city, somewhere around 175 BC, was most probably wreaked by Bastarni passing through after being called upon by Macedonian king Philip V or Perseus to reinforce the army.

Hellenistic layer III (175–100 BC)
Mithridates installed a military garrison in Histria, which probably caused the third destruction of the city in the Hellenistic period. During the rule of Mithridates staters are minted in Histria.

Hellenistic layer IV (100–20 BC)
Burebista arrived in Dobruja.
 (Gaius Antonius Hybrida)...while governor of Macedonia, had inflicted many injuries upon the subject territory as well as upon that which was in alliance with Rome, and had suffered many disasters in return. 2 For after ravaging the possessions of the Dardanians and their neighbours, he did not dare to await their attack, but pretending to retire with his cavalry for some other purpose, took to flight; in this way the enemy surrounded his infantry and forcibly drove them out of the country, even taking away their plunder from them. 3 When he tried the same tactics on the allies in Moesia, he was defeated near the city of the Istrians by the Bastarnian Scythians who came to their aid; and thereupon he ran away...

The Hellenistic period was ended by Marcus Antonius who was in charge of the eastern Roman government, and was defeated by Octavian at Actium.

Roman layers

Early Roman layer IA (30–100 AD)
Continuous with the Hellenistic period. A new thermae (Thermae I) was built. This period is considered by historians, thanks to two inscribed artifacts, as the second founding of the city.

Early Roman layer IB (100–170 AD)
In around 170 AD, a part of the town was destroyed.

Early Roman layer IC (170–250 AD)
The town suffered serious destruction from which it never recovered. The main theory is that it was destroyed by an invasion of Goths and Carpi. Another theory presumes that the town was destroyed in an earthquake.

Late Roman layers IIA (after 250 AD)
Late Roman layer IIB
Late Roman layer IIIA
Late Roman layer IIIB
Late Roman layer IVA
Late Roman layer IVB
Late Roman layer VA
Late Roman layer VB

Bulgarian period (9th and 10th centuries)
Bulgars arrived in Scythia Minor in the late 7th century.

Gallery

See also

Capidava
Civitas Tropaensium
Halmyris
List of ancient towns in Scythia Minor
Peuce Island
Tropaeum Traiani

References

External links
The Histria Archaeological Site
Histria, dr. Al. Suceveanu, dr. M. Angelescu eds
Histria's New Look - A 3D Model, dr. M. Angelescu
History Microregion Sinoe - by Doctor Archaeologist Catalin Dobrinescu
 Tur video Histria - INP 360
 Hellenistic Greek inscriptions of Istros in English translation
 Greek cities on the western coast of the Black Sea, dissertation by S.Andrews, Chapter 4 (PDF)
 Wheel money /wheel coin/, 500-400 BC: ancient city Istros

Former cities in Romania
Ruins in Romania
History of Dobruja
Milesian Pontic colonies
Tourist attractions in Romania
Byzantine sites in Romania
Roman sites in Romania
Former populated places in Romania
Ionian colonies in Thrace
Greek colonies in Scythia Minor
Buildings and structures in Constanța County
Tourist attractions in Constanța County
Populated places in ancient Thrace